Gustav Knepper Power Station was a coal-fired power station in Dortmund-Mengede in Germany, close to Castrop-Rauxel.  It started operation in 1971 and ended on December 23, 2014.

The power station was built at the former Gustav Knepper coal mine. The first owner of the Power Station was the Gelsenkirchener Bergwerks AG.  It was then taken over by the Bochumer Bergwerks AG.

The power station was demolished on February 17, 2019.

References

Coal-fired power stations in Germany
Economy of North Rhine-Westphalia
Buildings and structures in Dortmund